Kaes Van't Hof (born August 1, 1986) is a former American tennis player from the United States.

Early life 
Van't Hof was born and raised in Newport Beach, California.

Education 
Van't Hof was a four year scholarship athlete at the University of Southern California (USC). His senior year, he won the 2008 Pac-10 NCAA Singles Title and the 2008 Pac-10 NCAA Doubles Title with his partner, Farah. In 2008, Van't Hof graduated with a degree in Business Administration.

He and his father Robert became the first father and son to win the intercollegiate singles championship since it was added to the Ojai Tennis Tournament in 1911.

Professional career 
Van't Hof played at the 2008 and 2009 U.S. Open reaching the third round of the men's doubles tournament with his partner, Michael McClune.

Since retiring from professional tennis, Van't Hof has worked for Citigroup Global Markets, Wexford Capital, Bison Drilling and Field Services, and Diamondback Energy.

References

External links 
 
 
 USC Trojans bio

1986 births
Living people
American male tennis players
American people of Dutch descent
Sportspeople from Newport Beach, California
USC Trojans men's tennis players
Tennis people from California